The Trouble With Money or  Komedie om Geld  is a 1936 Dutch comedy film directed by Max Ophüls. Producer was Will Tuschinski, son of Abraham Tuschinski. It was released on DVD in 2008.

At the time, the film was the most expensive production ever to have been made in the Netherlands costing around 150,000 guilders. On its initial release, it only took around 10,000 guilders at the box office.

Cast
Herman Bouber	... 	Karel Brand
Matthieu van Eysden	... 	Ferdinand
Rini Otte	... 	Willy, Daughter of Brand
Cor Ruys	... 	Moorman
Edwin Gubbins Doorenbos	... 	Verteller (voice)
Lau Ezerman		
Arend Sandhouse		
Richard Flinck		
Corry Vonk		
Bert van Dongen		
Gerard Doting		
Gerard Hartkamp		
Christine van Meeteren

Notes and references

Bibliography
 Mathijs, Ernest. The Cinema of the Low Countries. Wallflower Press, 2004.

External links 
 

1936 films
Dutch black-and-white films
1936 comedy films
Films directed by Max Ophüls
Dutch comedy films
1930s Dutch-language films